Bielanka  (Bilianka; , Bilianka) is a village in the administrative district of Gmina Gorlice, within Gorlice County, Lesser Poland Voivodeship, in southern Poland.

The village has a population of 191.

References

Villages in Gorlice County